Medical Associates for Research and Communication (MARC) is a Non-Governmental Organisation that works globally with medical students and researchers with little to no background in research. Their primary goal is to help these researchers complete their research work using appropriate scientific methods thereby maintaining high scientific and research standards. Members of MARC were involved in a pilot study that later proved to be a landmark research study that formed the impetus for the creation of a 911 like system in India.

History
MARC was established by Ritam Chowdhury in December 2008, in Mumbai, India. Although started in 2008, the foundations of MARC were laid down much earlier in 2005. As per an interview, MARC was established to "overcome the lack of adequate research training led to improper application of scientific principles. This led to many good research ideas by medical students and researchers being rejected when submitted for review." Thus, MARC was formed as an NGO to help guide medical students and researchers avoid these pitfalls. Members of MARC collaborate widely with many researchers from across the globe.

Philosophy
MARC and its members provide a safe environment wherein researchers could voice their concerns. 
MARC focused on connecting researchers with resources and providing technical or scientific expertise on a pro bono basis. In addition, they conduct health education and community outreach volunteer work in different parts of India. All work done by MARC is pro bono. Collaborators who assist MARC in its activities volunteer their time and thus help in training the next generation of researchers and public health professionals.

Members
MARC was founded by Ritam Chowdhury. Chowdhury is also a Visiting Instructor-Global Health at Emory University Rollins School of Public Health and statistical consultant at Harvard School of Public Health

See also
Translational Research
Epidemiology
Biostatistics

References

Organisations based in Mumbai
Medical and health organisations based in India
Organizations established in 2008
2008 establishments in Maharashtra